Peabody High School was a public school in  Pittsburgh, Pennsylvania, in the neighborhood of East Liberty. The school opened in 1911 after the renovations of the former Margaretta Street elementary school and was rededicated in honor of Highland Park Doctor Benjamin H. Peabody. After 100 years in operation, the school board of the Pittsburgh Public Schools voted to close the school and graduate its final class in 2011.

The Barack Obama Academy of International Studies 6-12 relocated to the building starting in the 2012–2013 school year. The Peabody name was no longer used.

Notable alumni
 Kevan Barlow – NFL player
 Mike Barnes – NFL player
 Romare Bearden – artist and writer
 Mel Bennett – NBA player
 Kenneth Burke – literary theorist who wrote on 20th-century philosophy, aesthetics, criticism, and rhetorical theory 
 Malcolm Cowley – novelist, poet, literary critic and journalist
 Billy Eckstine – singer and bandleader
 Ed Gainey – politician
 George Otto Gey – cell biologist
 Jack Gilbert – poet
Barry Goldberg – volleyball coach
 Frank Gorshin – actor and comedian
 Charles Grodin – actor, comedian, author and television talk show host
Gene Kelly – dancer, actor and choreographer
Marie S. Klooz  – lawyer, pacifist
 David Logan – NFL player Tampa Bay Buccaneers
 Lorin Maazel – conductor, violinist and composer
 Michael "Dodo" Marmarosa – jazz pianist
 Natalie Moorhead – actress
 Zelda Rubinstein – actor, and human rights activist
 Edith S. Sampson – lawyer, judge and United Nations delegate
 Robert Schmertz – artist
 Bob Smizik – newspaper sportswriter and columnist
 David Stock – composer and conductor, founder of the Pittsburgh New Music Ensemble
 Burton Tansky – department store executive
 David Tepper – hedge fund manager and philanthropist
 Regis Toomey – actor
 Fritz Weaver – actor
 John Edgar Wideman – writer and professor
 Jonathan Wolken – dancer, co-founder, artistic director of Pilobolus dance company.
 Frank G. Marcello – renowned Pittsburgh artist, founder of Marcello Studios, an illustration studio in downtown Pittsburgh, working with McCann Erickson, Westinghouse, and the Arch Diocese of Pittsburgh.

References

External links
 Official website
 Pittsburgh Public Schools

High schools in Pittsburgh
Defunct schools in Pennsylvania
Educational institutions established in 1911
Educational institutions disestablished in 2011
1911 establishments in Pennsylvania